Makit County is a county in Kashgar Prefecture, Xinjiang Uyghur Autonomous Region, China. The Yarkand River passes through the county. The county is bordered to the north by Maralbexi County, to the east by Guma County (Pishan) in Hotan Prefecture, to the west by Yarkant County, and to the south by Kargilik County.

Name
The name of the county is also transliterated from Uyghur as Markit, Mekit and Merket, and from Mandarin Chinese as Maigaiti (Mai-kai-t'i, Maikaiti).

History
In 1928, Makit County was created as part of Kashgar Circuit.

In 2002, 240 Tajik (China) households displaced from Taxkorgan reclaimed a desert village in the county.

In early 2011, a Uyghur butcher in Makit County and six friends were arrested in connection with the stabbing death of a Han Chinese prostitute.

As part of the policies of Chen Quanguo, 61 convenience police stations were being built in the county in 2016.

In August 2018, a 10-year-old boy whose parents were detained in the Xinjiang re-education camps drowned in the Zerepshan River.

According to an anonymous Uyghur local government employee quoted in a Radio Free Asia article, during Ramadan 2020 (April 23 to May 23), residents of the county were told they could face punishment for fasting including being sent to a re-education camp.

Climate
The number of days of dusty/sandy weather per annum in Makit County has dropped from 106 in 2010 to 40 in 2018.

Administrative divisions
Towns (بازىرى / 镇)

Makit Town (Maigaiti;  / ), Bazarjemi (Bazajiemi;  / , formerly a township  / )

Townships (يېزىسى / 乡)
Shehitdong Township (Xiyitidun;  / ), Yantak Township (Yangtake, Yantaq;  / ), Tümantal Township (Tumantale, Tumental;  / ), Ghazkol Township (Gazikule;  / ), Qizilawat Township (Kezile'awati;  / ), Qumqisar Township (Kumukusa'er;  / ), Hangghitliq Township (Anggeteleke;  / ), Qurma Township (Ku'erma;  / )

Others
五一林场, 胡杨林场, 良种场, 园艺场, 兵团43团, 兵团45团, 兵团46团, 农三师前进水库管理处

Economy
The county has a highly developed irrigation system. Agricultural products of the county include cotton, corn, wheat, flax, melons, and sugar beet. The livestock industry is strong. Local specialities include dried apricot and raisins. Industries include coal mining, tractor manufacture, construction, textiles, etc.

Demographics

As of 2015, 225,608 of the 272,010 residents of the county were Uyghur, 45,241 were Han Chinese and 1,161 were from other ethnic groups.

As of 1999, 78.36% of the population of Makit (Markit, Maigaiti) County was Uyghur and 21.43% of the population was Han Chinese.

Transportation
 Sanchakou–Yarkant Expressway

Historical maps
Historical English-language maps including Makit:

See also
 Yarkand River

Notes

References

External links
 Sandstorm Affects Traffic during May Day Holiday in Northwest China Counties (Local traffic police direct traffic at major road sections in the county during a sandstorm)

County-level divisions of Xinjiang
Kashgar Prefecture